Preston Brown (January 2, 1872 – June 30, 1948) was an American army officer who saw action with the American Expeditionary Forces in World War I.  Brown reached the rank of major general before retiring from active duty in 1936.

Early life
Brown was born in Lexington, Kentucky. His mother was Mary Owen Preston, who was the daughter of General William C. Preston of the Confederate Army, while his father John Mason Brown was a Union Army colonel. He attended Yale, where he served on the editorial board of The Yale Record. After his graduation in 1892, he also studied in the University of Virginia.

Military career

Brown entered the army as a private in 1894 and served in Battery A, Fifth Field Artillery. He was commissioned a second lieutenant in 1897 and rose through the ranks. He was promoted to major in 1916 and lieutenant colonel in 1917. In 1918, after the American entry into World War I, he was appointed a colonel in the National Army and in August of the same year was promoted to brigadier general.

He served as chief of staff of the 2nd Division at Château-Thierry and Saint-Mihiel between April 6–September 18, 1918, and was Chief of Staff of IV Corps between September 20–October 1918. On October 18, 1918, he became commander of the 3rd Division, serving in that capacity through the Battle of Meuse-Argonne. He was awarded the Army Distinguished Service Medal for his wartime service. The citation reads:

In November 1918, he became assistant chief of staff at General Headquarters of the U.S. Army of Occupation.  He was appointed an instructor at the Army General Staff College in 1919. In 1921, he was acting commander of the U.S. Army War College and in the same year was appointed commander of the 3rd Infantry Brigade.  Preston Brown was commander of the Panama Canal Zone from 1928 until 1932. From October 1933 to October 1934 he commanded the Sixth Corps Area.

Brown retired to Martha's Vineyard, Massachusetts in 1936, having reached the rank of major general.

Personal life
In 1905, Brown married Susan Ford Dorrance. They had one child, Dorrance Brown who died in 1936.

Brown was active in genealogical research until his death. He was also a member of the Historical Society of Cincinnati.

Death and burial
Brown died in Vineyard Haven, Massachusetts on June 30, 1948 and is interred in Cave Hill Cemetery, Louisville, Kentucky.

Awards
Distinguished Service Medal
Spanish War Service Medal
Philippine Campaign Medal
Mexican Border Service Medal
World War I Victory Medal
Commander, Legion of Honor (France)

See also

References

Bibliography

Order of Battle of the United States Land Forces in the World War. Washington: US Government Printing Office, 1931.

Recipients of the Distinguished Service Medal (US Army)
Military personnel from Lexington, Kentucky
Yale University alumni
United States Army generals of World War I
1872 births
1948 deaths
Burials at Cave Hill Cemetery
People from Tisbury, Massachusetts
United States Army Command and General Staff College faculty
United States Army generals